Steve Masakowski (born September 2, 1954) is jazz guitarist, educator, and inventor. He invented the guitar-based keytar and the switch pick, and has designed three custom-built seven-string guitars. He developed an approach to playing the guitar by using his pick design, allowing him to switch from fingerpicking to flatpicking.

He has released solo albums and has worked with Johnny Adams, Mose Allison, Dave Liebman, Ellis Marsalis, Jr., Carl Fontana, Rick Margitza, Bobby McFerrin, Nicholas Payton, Dianne Reeves,  Sam Rivers, Woody Shaw, Alvin Tyler, and Bennie Wallace. Since 1987, he has been a member of the band Astral Project.

He has been voted Best Guitarist twice and included as a member of Astral Project in the Best Contemporary Jazz Group three times by Gambit and Offbeat magazines in their annual readers' poll. He has published lessons in Guitar Player magazine and wrote the book Jazz Ear Training – Learning to Hear Your Way Through Music for Mel Bay Publications. He has also been recognized by Down Beat magazine as Guitar Talent Deserving Wider Recognition.

Career

Early life
Masakowski was born in New Orleans, Louisiana, on September 2, 1954. The Beatles influenced his desire to play guitar. When he was fourteen, he played bass guitar and co-founded the band Truth, which was based on the rock band Cream. In high school he became interested in composing, and he started taking guitar lessons to learn about harmony. His teacher introduced him to the music of jazz guitarists Joe Pass, Wes Montgomery, Pat Martino, and Lenny Breau.

He went to the Berklee College of Music in 1974, studying music theory, arranging, and composition. After getting his degree, he returned to New Orleans with his girlfriend, jazz guitarist Emily Remler, and founded the group Fourplay (not to be confused with the later jazz group of the same name). From 1976 to 1978, he studied classical composition and orchestration with Bert Braud, a teacher at the New Orleans Center for Creative Arts who also taught Terence Blanchard, Harry Connick, Jr., Branford Marsalis, and Wynton Marsalis.

Returning to New Orleans

In the early 1980s, Masakowski played regularly with local New Orleans musicians such as Earl Turbinton, Jr., Alvin Tyler, and Willie Tee. With Singleton and drummer Johnny Vidacovich, he accompanied visiting musicians such as Randy Brecker, Tom Harrell, Art Baron, and Dave Liebman. He founded the group Mars with Larry Sieberth (keyboards), James Singleton (bass), and James Black (drums). The band played a mixture of jazz and electronic music, sometimes combined with visual art created by Jon Graubarth. Dave Liebman played on the first Mars album (1983).

In 1982, Masakowski founded the Composers Recording Studio with harpist Patrice Fisher, guitarist Jimmy Robinson, and violinist Denise Villere. He often acted as audio engineer and sometimes record producer. The studio lasted about ten years and recorded Harry Connick Jr., Ellis Marsalis Jr., Tony Dagradi, the Dirty Dozen Brass Band, and pianist James Drew.

For three years, Masakowski worked in a duet with pianist Ellis Marsalis, Jr. In 1987, he joined Astral Project. From 1993–1996, he toured with singer Dianne Reeves. He leads the band Nova NOLA, whose members include his son, double bassist Martin, and his daughter, vocalist Sasha Masakowski. He released two albums for Blue Note Records: What It Was (1994) and Direct AXEcess (1995). New Orleans guitarist, banjoist, and historian Danny Barker wrote the liner notes for What It Was. When Barker died in 1994, he bequeathed his acoustic guitar to Masakowski.

He was hired by Marsalis to teach in the jazz program at the University of New Orleans. In 1991, he became a full-time faculty member. After the retirement of Marsalis and a short tenure by Terence Blanchard, he became Chair of Jazz Studies and director of the jazz program in 2004.

Inventions

In 1978, Masakowski invented the key-tar,  a guitar-like instrument with seven rows of keys instead of strings, one key at each fret. This pre-MIDI controller was hardwired to a Moog synthesizer. One advantage of such an instrument was that it allowed playing more than one note in a row of keys at the same time, the equivalent on the guitar of playing multiple simultaneous notes on one string. Masakowski's song "Stepping Stone" was composed on the keytar, which allowed for the cluster-type chord voicings. For the duration of the Mars era, his rig included a Gretsch seven-string guitar with the keytar fastened to the top. He chose not to pursue a patent for the keytar, opting to concentrate on a revised prototype of the instrument that failed due to lack of funding.

In 1987, Masakowski invented the switch pick to help when switching from fingers to plectrum. "I invented something I call a switch-pick, which is a sort of thumb pick...[made] in such a way that if I slide it up my finger, the support part doesn't come in contact with my thumb, so it feels like a normal pick. And then if I want to use it as a thumb pick, I just slide it up my finger, and I can play finger style with the thumb pick using all five fingers."

He told an interviewer, "The pick is more efficient and has a better sound on fast lines where I need swing drive, but certain ideas, like fast diatonic-fourth runs, are easier to play fingerstyle."

Inspired by a visit to New Orleans by seven-string guitarist Bucky Pizzarelli, Masakowski began to explore the seven-string guitar, first finding an early Gretsch, then designing his own models which have the expanded range of a normal guitar and bass guitar combined. His custom designs were built by luthiers Jimmy Foster and Salvador Giardina.

Personal life
In 1982, Masakowski married German pianist Ulrike Antonie Sprenger. The couple have two children, both professional musicians: vocalist Sasha Masakowski (b. 1986) and double bassist Martin (b. 1990). Since 2007, the Masakowski family has been playing in bands together, including the group Nova NOLA.

In 2017 the Masakowski Family released the album N.O. Escape, a combination of jazz, gypsy jazz, and vocal jazz. Steve Masakowski co-wrote three songs based on the novel A Confederacy of Dunces.

Awards and honors
 10 best guitarists list, Wavelength magazine (1991)
 Big Easy Award, Astral Project (1993, 1994, 2000)
 Best Guitarist (1994–1998, 2002) OffBeat magazine 
 Best Contemporary Jazz Group (1994–2002), Astral Project, OffBeat magazine
 Keeping the Music Alive Award, Danny Barker Estate (2003)
 Global Excellence Award, Summers Multicultural Institute (2005)
 Germaine Bazzle Award for Music Education and Performance (2014)

Discography

As leader

With Astral Project

As sideman

References

1954 births
Living people
American jazz guitarists
Jazz musicians from New Orleans
Skye Records artists
20th-century American guitarists
Astral Project members